Adrian Segecic (born 1 June 2004), is an Australian professional footballer who plays as a midfielder for Sydney FC.

Career

Segecic started his career with Sydney FC.

References

External links

Living people
2004 births
Australian soccer players
Association football midfielders
Sydney FC players
A-League Men players
National Premier Leagues players
Australian people of Croatian descent